Meda Chesney-Lind is a feminist, criminologist, and an advocate for girls and women who come in contact with the criminal justice system.

She works to find alternatives to women's incarceration and is an advocate for humanitarian solutions within the Hawaiian criminal justice system. She focuses on teaching courses on girls' delinquency and women's crime, issues of girls' programming and women's imprisonment, youth gangs, the sociology of gender, and the victimization of women and girls. Over much of the past two decades, her focus has been on improvement of the Hawaiian correctional system through producing articles for newspapers, books, and journals, as well as working with community-based agencies and giving talks to local organizations and legislators. She has also been credited with helping to direct national attention to services for delinquent girls.

Chesney-Lind received her B.A. in 1969 from Whitman College and both her M.A. (1971) and Ph.D. (1977) from the University of Hawaii at Honolulu. She is an adjunct professor at the University of Illinois at Chicago, professor emerita of the Department of Women's, Gender and Sexuality Studies University of Hawaii at Mānoa, and a senior research fellow at Portland State University.

Research projects and grants
Chesney-Lind has received various grants to fund research projects and initiatives, ranging from $6,000 - $422,121. She was the principal investigator for Hawaii's Youth Gang Response Evaluation (YGRE). Chesney-Lind received over $700,000 in increments between 1992 and 2005 for the project, which centered on interviews and analysis with current youth gang members, research on delinquency and gang members of youth at risk in Hawaii. She also received a contract for a three-year pilot project (2003–2004) for which she was granted almost $40,000 to provide evaluation services to the Family Drug Court (first circuit) in the state of Hawaii. Chesney-Lind has most recently been granted $15,000 to provide evaluation services to Family Court's pilot project of developing a "girls' court." This court intends to address female delinquents with a history of offending on the island of Oahu.

Awards
Meda Chesney-Lind has been awarded the University of Hawaii Board Of Regents' Medal for Excellence in Research. In 1996, the American Society of Criminology named her a Fellow. She has also received national and international awards including the Academy of Criminal Justice Sciences' Bruce Smith, Sr. Award, the Distinguished Scholar Award from the Women and Crime Division of the American Society of Criminology, the "Major Achievement Award" from the Division of Critical Criminology, the Herbert Block Award for service to the society and the profession from the American Society of Criminology, and the Donald Cressey Award from the National Council on Crime and Delinquency in 1997 for her outstanding academic contribution to the field of criminology.

Published works
Book synopsis - The Female Offender: Girls, Women and Crime - In this book Meda Chesney-Lind and Lisa Pasko focus on and try to give the reader an understanding the lives of girl and women offenders and show how poverty, sexism and racism haunt their lives. The authors' goal is to help make the plight of women and girl offenders visible because, as the authors argue, in society's neglect of girls and women: "we begin to deny our own humanity and the humanity of those we imprison".

The book highlights how theories and research on crime and delinquency have historically ignored women and girls and that they were forgotten altogether during the second wave of feminism. Women and girls were an afterthought of a system designed for men. The authors explain that more recent research has shown how women's and girls' victimization narrows their choices and provide the background for their entrance into unemployment, prostitution or survival sex, drug use and abuse, homelessness and other criminal acts. The authors explain that girls' pathways to crime are further affected by the gendered nature of society. The authors also discuss the increased rates of women's and girls' imprisonment in the 21st century, and ask: "What led these women into criminal behavior? Are today's women more violent than their counterparts in the past decades? How could such a change in public policy towards women (that led to their increased imprisonment) have happened with so little fanfare?" They explain that society must stop punishing girls and women based on myths bolstered by bad information and instead seek recourse in the real causes of their offending. As well, the lack of civil rights guaranteed to youth makes their arrest possible and normal, in the case of girls, even when they are fleeing horrific situations. Chesney-Lind and Pasko explain that the answer to the last question, how could the dramatic increase in the prison population of women, lies in the societal anxiety that surrounds women and girl offenders. Furthermore, because the majority of people are arrested and imprisoned are poor and therefore without a voice and the authors argue to counter these challenges we must focus attention on girls and women offender, engage them as persons, listen to their story and ultimately turn the prisoner into a person. The authors claim that to fix these problems we could choose not to imprison marginalized girls and women, as we often do for white women and girls. They posit this would be unlikely to cause a surge in crime as most women and girls are in need of training, education and support, not punishment. They also suggest society should work to strengthen the bond between women, their communities and their children. The authors support their claims by showing that the increased imprisonment of women is not a result of new crimes and that decreases in the prison population would not only save taxpayers money but could be achieved through policy changes. The authors end the book by explaining that if society can begin to stop relying on imprisonment for women we can begin to consider this approach for men as well. They explain that the majority of male offenders are also marginalized by racism and poverty and furthermore, that they are the brothers, fathers and sons of marginalized women.

Article synopsis - "What About the Girls: Delinquency and Programming as if Gender Mattered". In this article Meda Chesney-Lind discusses some of the problems with programming for girls who come in contact with the criminal justice system. She posits that despite increased arrests of young girls, they are almost always invisible when the delinquency problem is discussed and largely forgotten when programs for delinquents are designed. In this article Chesney-Lind argues: (1) that  girls in the justice system and invisible in terms of programming and that their risk factors differ than boys; (2) that programming is often based on a one issue at a time approach which ignores the interrelatedness of girls' problems; (3) that girls are triply marginalized, by their age, race and class, structural inequalities and institutional racism and programs must therefore empower and advocate for meaningful changes and (4) that although statistics show an increase in girls violence, often resulting in more punitive sanctions, this is not the case as girl violence has simply been historically ignored. The claims made by Chesney-Lind are conceptual. Her claims relate to notions and ideas about girls and programming. However, they would not have come about without earlier empirical studies and research from which her claims developed. For example, her claim that girls are triply marginalized and that programming must empower and advocate for meaningful change would not have developed as such without an analysis of the empirical studies that claim girls' violence is increasing. As well, her claim that girls' in the justice system are invisible in terms of programming would not have been possible without the empirical research that showed statistically that girls lack programs designed specifically for them. The evidence, both empirical and conceptual, Chesney-Lind supplies supports her claims. She draws from a wide variety of sources to show that girls are forgotten when programs for delinquents are crafted. As well, her argument that girls are almost always invisible when delinquency is discussed is supported by evidence that shows girls' violence/offending has been historically ignored as well as the development of programs that address issues one at a time. This approach is not conducive to the interrelatedness of girls' problems. Furthermore, focusing on risk factors such as substance and drug abuse would be more suited for boys than girls whose risk factors are more internalizing.

Article synopsis - "From Invisible to Incorrigible: The Demonization of Marginalized Women and Girls". In this article Chesney-Lind and Eliason discuss the ways in which popular culture (media, books, movies etc.) as well as academic discourses have aided in the demonization of adult lesbians and adolescent girls. The authors explore how and why some feminist scholars have either ignored or contributed to the criminalizing of behaviors that are considered non-feminine.  The authors argue that a backlash against women's progress has led to the vilification of females who show signs of masculinity and while popular culture often depicts women offenders as masculinized or sexualized white women that the backlash actually affects women of color, poor women and lesbian/bisexual women. The authors explain that 'bad girls', that is, those girls whom the feminist movement has encouraged to seek, not only equality in the social realm, but also equality in the male world of crime. Girls are viewed as masculinized monsters and it is believed they commit crimes for the same reasons as men. Following this line of reasoning, theories of violence and crime do not need to include gender specific ideology but instead can simply apply male theories to women and girls. However, simply because a few girls and women behave in aggressive, violent, abusive or mean ways does not devalue gender-based theories of crime, aggression and violence. Furthermore, girls, women and even boys and men take in conflicting messages embedded in culture. They grow up in a world that accepts and valorises male violence. The authors support this claim by explaining that because masculinity is equated with power, girls and women may seek to gain power, control and respect by acting out in violent, masculine ways. However, they often commit horizontal violence, that is, their crimes are not committed against the males who threaten them but instead commit crimes against members of their own group, other marginalized girls, and women. In the case of lesbians, crimes are often against other lesbians or their partner. The authors also argue that the masculinized construction of women and girl offenders serves solely to increase punitive sanctions against these groups and sends a message to all women: if you deviate from the feminine norm you may be arrested and incarcerated. They support this claim by pointing out that most evidence shows that women are not committing more violent acts and instead evidence shows that certain groups of women are being constructed in popular culture as masculine and violent. They highlight this through describing various analyses of the 2003 film Monster. The authors also claim that the media and criminal justice system play an important role in controlling women through the masculinization and demonization of a few women. This construction casts these groups out of the protective sphere of femininity while the criminal justice system moves in to process and punish them. Lastly, Chesney-Lind and Eliason posit that until male and female aggression is understood, not only in the context of patriarchy which oppresses both sexes but also within the social systems of racism, heterosexism and classism, increases in arrest rates, incarceration and the execution of masculinized women will continue.

Bibliography (partial)
Bowker, L.H., (1978). Women, crime and the criminal justice system. Lexington, Mass.: Lexington Books. (Contributions by Meda Chesney-Lind and Joy Pollock).
Brown, L.M., Chesney-Lind, M. & Stein, N., (2007). Patriarchy matters: Toward a gendered theory of teen violence and victimization. Violence Against Women. 13, 1249–1273.
Chesney-Lind, M., (1997). The female offender: Girls, women and crime. Thousand Oaks: Sage Publications.
Chesney-Lind, Meda and Nikki Jones (eds).(2010). Fighting for Girls: Critical Perspectives on Gender and Violence. Albany, NY: SUNY Press.  In press.
Chesney-Lind, Meda, (2006). Patriarchy, crime, justice: Feminist criminology in an era of backlash. Feminist Criminology. 1(1), 6-26.
Chesney-Lind, M., (2007). Beyond bad girls: Feminist perspectives on female offending in The Blackwell companion to criminology (Sumner, C.  & Chambliss, W.J., eds). Malden: Blackwell Publishing.
Chesney-Lind, M. & Eliason, M., (2006). From invisible to incorrigible: The demonization of marginalized women and girls. Crime, Media, Culture. 2(1), 29–47.
Chesney-Lind, M. &  Hagedorn, J.M., (eds.) (1998). Female gangs in America: Essays on gender, and gangs. Lakeview Press.
Chesney-Lind, M. & Irwin, K., (2008). Beyond bad girls: Gender, violence and hype. New York: Rutledge.
Chesney-Lind, M., Morash, M. & Irwin, K., (2007). Policing girlhood? Relational aggression and violence prevention. Youth Violence and Juvenile Justice. 5(3), 328–345.
Chesney-Lind, M., Morash, M. & Stevens, T., (2008). Girls' troubles, girls' delinquency, and gender responsive programming: A review. Australian and New Zealand Journal of Criminology. 41 (1), 162–189.
Chesney-Lind, M. & Pasko, L. (eds.), (2004a). Girls, women and crime: Selected readings. Thousand Oaks, Calif.: Sage Publications.
Chesney-Lind, M. & Pasko, L., (2004b). The female offender: Girls, women and crime (2nd ed.) Thousand Oaks, Calif.: Sage Publications.
Chesney-Lind, M. & Shelden, R.G., (1998). Girls, delinquency, and juvenile justice (2nd ed.). Belmont, CA: West/Wadsworth.
Davidson, S., (ed.), (1982). Justice for young women: Close-up on critical issues. Tucson, Arizona: New Directions for Young Women, inc. (Introduction by Meda Chesney-Lind).
Gavazzi, S.M., Yarcheck, C.M. &  Chesney-Lind, M., (2006). Global risk indicators and the role of  gender in a juvenile detention sample. Criminal Justice and Behaviour. 33(5), 597–612.
Mauer, M. & Chesney-Lind, M., (eds.) (2002). Invisible Punishment: The collateral consequences of mass imprisonment. New York: New Press.

References 

1947 births
Living people
American criminologists
American women criminologists
University of Hawaiʻi at Mānoa alumni
University of Hawaiʻi faculty
Whitman College alumni